Zulfiya Abdiqadir (born May 1966) is a Uyghur civil servant in the People's Republic of China.

Education
Zulfiya completed her undergraduate degree at what is now the Xinjiang Agricultural University in Ürümqi. She completed her master's at the Chinese Communist Party School of Xinjiang.

Career
In 1984, Zulfiya joined the science and technology branch of the Xinjiang Uyghur Autonomous Region Regional Road Transportation Administrative Bureau. Over the next 18 years, she worked in other branches of the department, including vehicle management, project management, and safety regulations. In 2002, Zulfiya was appointed the bureau's chief economic engineer.

Zulfiya became a member of the bureau's Party Committee in 2004. In 2007, she was appointed deputy bureau chief and put in charge of administrative affairs. Less than one year later, Zulfiya became deputy secretary of the bureau's Party Committee, as well as bureau chief.

She served as a representative for Xinjiang at the 11th National People's Congress from 2008 to 2013.

In 2015, Zulfiya was appointed to head of the Transport Department of Xinjiang Uyghur Autonomous Region and became the deputy secretary of the department's Party Committee.

References

Chinese Communist Party politicians from Xinjiang
Living people
1966 births
Uyghurs
Political office-holders in Xinjiang
People's Republic of China politicians from Xinjiang